Electrica is a private company, listed on the Bucharest and London stock exchanges. Electrica is the only listed Romanian company in the field of electricity distribution and supply in Romania. Electrica Group is a key player in the electricity distribution and supply market in Romania, as well as one of the most important players in the energy services sector.

The main activities of the Group are represented by the distribution and supply of electricity to final customers.

The company was established in 1998 as a division of CONEL (Compania Națională de Electricitate), the largest electric power distribution company in the country at that time, but became a stand-alone company in 2000 when CONEL was restructured.

History
The story of Electrica begins in 1921, when the „Societatea Română pentru Întreprinderi Electrice Industriale”, founded in 1898, becomes “S.C. ELECTRICA S.A. – Societate Anonimă Română".

In 1990, after the fall of the communist regime, the first electric power distribution company was called RENEL or Regia Autonomă de Electricitate. The company owned and operated everything in the field of electricity production, transmission and distribution in Romania and had an installed production capacity of around 20,000 MW. In 1998 RENEL is dissolved and divided into three companies CONEL (supply and distribution), Nuclearelectrica (production) and Regia Autonomă pentru Activități Nucleare or RAAN (production and research).

Since 1998 the company that took over all the production and transport facilities of the former RENEL was CONEL  (Compania Națională de Electricitate). The company had three branches, Termoelectrica specialized in production of thermal and electric power from fossil fuels, Hidroelectrica specialized in production of electric power from renewable sources especially hydro power plants and Electrica specialized in the supply and distribution of electric power. In 2000 the CONEL company was dissolved and the three branches that formed it became separate companies including a new one called Transelectrica specialized in the transportation of electric power thru power lines.

The current Electrica company was established in 2000 after the break-up of CONEL and initially had eight branches "Transilvania Nord", "Transilvania Sud", "Muntenia Nord", "Muntenia Sud", "Moldova", "Oltenia", "Dobrogea" and "Banat". In 2005 Electrica privatized four of its branches namely "Moldova", "Oltenia", "Dobrogea" and "Banat" by selling 51% shares in each. The "Electrica Oltenia" branch was sold to the Czech company CEZ Group for €167 million while the "Electrica Moldova" branch was sold to the German company E.ON for €100 million. The "Electrica Banat" and "Dobrogea" were sold to the Italian company Enel for a combined €112 million. The Italian company also bought in 2008 a 64.4% stake in the "Electrica Muntenia Sud", the largest of the Electrica branches, for €820 million.

In 2011, "Electrica Furnizare Muntenia Nord", "Electrica Furnizare Transilvania Nord" and "Electrica Furnizare Transilvania Sud" merged into the trading company "Electrica Furnizare" SA.

In 2014, 51% of the shares of Electrica SA were double listed on the London Stock Exchange and on the Bucharest Stock Exchange. It was the biggest listing on the capital market in the country. The company collected at the time a record of almost LEI 2 billion (EUR 443 million).

Activity
Electrica is serving over 3.8 million customers in the entire country.

The Group's distribution activity is carried out through the three energy distribution companies: "SDEE Transilvania Nord", "SDEE Transilvania Sud", "SDEE Muntenia Nord". Also, the Group provides electricity to more than 3.5 million customers through the trading company "Electrica Furnizare" SA. The supply activity covers 18.69% (2019) of Romania's energy needs.

Electrica also has control over the services and maintenance company Electrica Serv. Electrica Serv operates in the fields of consulting and design, maintenance, inspections, overhauls and repairs of energy and measuring equipment. In 2016, Electrica had a network of about 116,500 km of power lines. In 2020, the company has a network of about 198,988 km of power lines. The company also has in its portfolio the Dimitrie Leonida Technical Museum.

References

External links
Official website

Electric power companies of Romania